The Canadian ambassador to Angola is the official representative of the Canadian government to the government of Angola. The official title for the ambassador is the Ambassador Extraordinary and Plenipotentiary of Canada to the Republic of Angola. The current Canadian ambassador is Christina Buchan who was appointed on the advice of Prime Minister Justin Trudeau on November 11, 2020.

The Consulate of Canada is located at Rua Rei Katyavala 113, Luanda, Angola.

History of diplomatic relations 

Diplomatic relations between Canada and Angola was established on February 3, 1978. Clayton George Bullis was appointed as Canada's first Ambassador to Angola on May 1, 1980.

List of Canadian ambassadors to Angola

Notes

References 

Bibliography

External Links 
 

Angola
 
Canada